The 2022 United States House of Representatives elections in Montana were held on November 8, 2022, to elect two U.S. Representatives from Montana, one from each of its congressional districts. Prior to this election cycle, Montana had one at-large district, represented by Republican Matt Rosendale. However, during the 2020 redistricting cycle, Montana regained the  that it lost in 1993. As a result, Montana became the first state relegated from multi-district to at-large status that reclaimed a 2nd representative in the House of Representatives, in which Rosendale ran for re-election.

Overview

District

District 1

The 1st district is based in mountainous Western Montana, including the cities of Missoula, Bozeman and Butte. It is currently represented along with the rest of the state by  representative Matt Rosendale. Since Rosendale is running for re-election in the 2nd district, this district is an open seat.

Republican primary

Candidates

Nominee
Ryan Zinke, former U.S. Secretary of the Interior and former U.S. Representative from

Eliminated in primary
Mitch Heuer
Matthew Jette, teacher and perennial candidate
Albert Olszewski, former state senator, candidate for U.S. Senate in 2018 and for Governor of Montana in 2020
Mary Todd, pastor

Endorsements

Results

Democratic primary

Candidates

Nominee
Monica Tranel, former Olympian and nominee for District 4 of the Montana Public Service Commission in 2020

Eliminated in primary
Cora Neumann, public health expert, founder of the Global First Ladies Alliance and candidate for U.S. Senate in 2020

Withdrew
Laurie Bishop, state representative

Declined
Kimberly Dudik, former state representative and candidate for Montana Attorney General in 2020
Shane Morigeau, state senator and nominee for Montana State Auditor in 2020 (running for re-election)
Whitney Williams, businesswoman, daughter of former U.S. Representative Pat Williams, and candidate for Governor of Montana in 2020

Endorsements

Results

Libertarian primary

Candidates

Nominee 
 John Lamb, farmer and business owner

General election

Predictions

Polling

Results

District 2

The 2nd district encompasses much of the state east of the Continental Divide, including the cities of Billings, Great Falls and Helena.

This was the first U.S. congressional election where the Democratic nominee finished third since the 2018 Maine Senate race.

Republican primary

Candidates

Nominee
Matt Rosendale, incumbent U.S. Representative from

Eliminated in primary
Kyle Austin, healthcare company owner
James Boyette, sales manager
Charles Walking Child, activist

Declined
Russell Fagg, former Yellowstone County district judge, former state representative, and candidate for U.S. Senate in 2018
Tim Fox, former Montana Attorney General and candidate for Governor of Montana in 2020
Brad Johnson, chair of the Montana Public Service Commission and former Montana Secretary of State

Endorsements

Results

Democratic primary

Candidates

Nominee
Penny Ronning, former Billings city councilor

Eliminated in primary
Skylar Williams, student

Deceased
Mark Sweeney, state senator (died May 6, 2022; remained on ballot)

Withdrawn
Jack Ballard, outdoor writer and candidate for U.S. Senate in 2020

Declined
Steve Bullock, former Governor of Montana, candidate for President of the United States in 2020, and nominee for U.S. Senate in 2020
Mike Cooney, former Lieutenant Governor of Montana  and nominee for Governor of Montana in 2020

Endorsements

Results

Libertarian primary

Candidates

Nominee
Sam Rankin, lawyer, real estate broker, and perennial candidate

Eliminated in primary
Roger Roots, nominee for U.S. Senate in 2014
Samuel Thomas

Results

Independents

Candidates

Declared
Gary Buchanan, financial advisor and former director of the Montana Department of Commerce

Disqualified
Curt Zygmond, beer brewing intern

Endorsements

General election

Predictions

Polling

Results

Notes

References

External links
Official campaign websites for 1st district candidates
Monica Tranel (D) for Congress
Ryan Zinke (R) for Congress

Official campaign websites for 2nd district candidates
Gary Buchanan (I) for Congress
Penny Ronning (D) for Congress
Matt Rosendale (R) for Congress

2022
Montana
United States House of Representatives